World Series of Fighting 33: Branch vs. Magalhães was a mixed martial arts event held on  at the Municipal Auditorium in Kansas City, Missouri, United States.

Background
The event was expected to be headlined by a Lightweight Championship bout between undefeated champion Justin Gaethje and Ozzy Dugulubgov. However the fight was cancelled on the day of the event as Dugulubgov was stricken with an illness.

David Branch will defend his WSOF Light Heavyweight Championship against Vinny Magalhães in the main event.

The fight between Jason High and João Zeferino was changed from a lightweight bout to a catchweight bout after High missed weight.

Results

See also
List of WSOF events
List of WSOF champions

References

Events in Kansas City, Missouri
World Series of Fighting events
2016 in mixed martial arts